Young Dillinger is a 1965 gangster film directed by Terry O. Morse. It stars Nick Adams as the notorious criminal John Dillinger, and co-stars Robert Conrad, John Ashley and Mary Ann Mobley.

Plot

With help from Elaine, his girlfriend, young John Dillinger breaks into her father's safe. They are caught, but Dillinger takes the rap by himself.

In prison, he meets Pretty Boy Floyd and Baby Face Nelson, who join Dillinger's gang after he masterminds a prison break. Elaine goes along, but when she becomes pregnant and is rejected by Dillinger, she rats him out to the FBI.

Cast
Nick Adams as John Dillinger
Robert Conrad as Pretty Boy Floyd
John Ashley as Baby Face Nelson
Mary Ann Mobley as Elaine
Victor Buono as Professor Hoffman
Dan Terranova as Homer Van Meter
John Hoyt as Dr. Wilson
Reed Hadley as Federal Agent Parker
Robert Osterloh as Federal Agent Baum
Anthony Caruso as Rocco
Art Baker as Warden
Gene Roth as Justice of Peace
Harvey Gardner as Mills

Production
The film was shot at Goldwyn Studios starting in November 1964. Al Zimbalist said he didn't want to glamourise the gangsters. "We just wanted to tell the story how three young men went wrong in hopes no other young people would make the same mistakes they made", he said.

Shot cheaply in 17 days without period costumes, Robert Conrad recalled that he only did the film to repay a favor to his friend Nick Adams. He says the film had "no budget" so "everyone had to do their own stunts" but it was during filming that he successfully auditioned for Wild Wild West.

John Ashley says the film "was basically all of (producer) Al Zimbalist's footage of machine guns and crashing cars from Baby Face Nelson (1957)."

Ashley added that the film "may have been the most fun of everything I ever did. At the time all three of us [Adams, Conrad and himself] were divorced. We were all living up in Nick's house. This film came along through Allied Artists. They actually approached Nick, and Nick said 'You should go see about getting John and Bobby'. We all agreed to it and we basically rewrote it. We took a lot of liberties with these three guys, but it was a lot of fun and a real pleasant experience." Ashley later produced some TV movies for Conrad.

During filming, the management of Allied Artists were engaged in a proxy fight with rebellious shareholders.

Adams and Zimbalist wanted to make another film together, Guns of the G Men. However it was never made.

Reception
The Los Angeles Times called it "a B picture with A virtues... good performances... crisp direction... fast moving and full of action.

Cinema Retro later wrote "the movie breezes along at a brisk pace even if the style is quite unimpressive and pedestrian. In fact, the film looks like a standard TV episode of "The Untouchables" in terms of production values...The performances are adequate, nothing more."

Notes

External links

New York Times review
Young Dillinger at BFI

1965 films
Allied Artists films
American black-and-white films
Films set in the 1920s
American gangster films
Crime films based on actual events
1960s English-language films
1965 crime drama films
Cultural depictions of Pretty Boy Floyd
Cultural depictions of John Dillinger
Cultural depictions of Baby Face Nelson
1960s historical films
American historical films
Films about John Dillinger
1960s American films